Gare d'Aumale (Aumale Station) is a rail station in the commune of Aumale in the Seine-Maritime department, France.  It is served by TER Hauts-de-France trains from Beauvais to Le Tréport-Mers.

See also 
 List of SNCF stations in Normandy

References

Railway stations in Seine-Maritime